Laurence Gordon Slack (17 March 1915 – 5 February 1991) was an Australian rules footballer who played with Geelong in the Victorian Football League (VFL).

Slack was a wingman, from East Geelong, who spent six seasons in the VFL. He was a member of Geelong's 1937 premiership team and had 15 kicks and seven marks in the grand final. Earlier in the season Slack missed four games through suspension for attempted striking, ending a four-year run where no Geelong player had fronted the tribunal. He remained a regular member of the side until 1940, when he was picked just once.

References

External links
 
 

1915 births
Australian rules footballers from Victoria (Australia)
Geelong Football Club players
Geelong Football Club Premiership players
East Geelong Football Club players
1991 deaths
One-time VFL/AFL Premiership players